Kinga Czuczor (born in Nové Zámky which was then in Czechoslovakia) is a Hungarian beauty pageant contestant. She is notable for winning the title of Miss Hungary in 1990. Czuczor went on to represent Hungary in the Miss World pageant which was held on November 8, 1990, at the London Palladium. She also represented Hungary at the Miss International pageant held on October 13, 1991, in Tokyo and various other beauty contests, like World Miss University, Miss Globe International, Miss Hawaiian Tropic.

She completed her studies at German and Russian faculty of ELTE University in Budapest, Hungary. After completion of her MA degree, she traveled to the United States to pursue further studies. She has been awarded scholarships at New School and New York University, in New York City, where she studied sociology, international relations and international politics between 1995 and 1999. Later in her career she worked at MTV Networks International and lives in Budapest, Hungary.

References

External links
 

1960s births
Living people
Hungarian female models
Miss World 1990 delegates
Hungarians in Slovakia
Hungarian beauty pageant winners
Miss International 1991 delegates
Eötvös Loránd University alumni